Giannetto Valli (1869–1927) was an Italian politician. He was mayor of Rome, Kingdom of Italy (1921–1922).

See also

References

1869 births
1927 deaths
20th-century Italian politicians
Mayors of Rome